Laurus is a genus of evergreen trees belonging to the laurel family, Lauraceae.

Laurus may also refer to:
Laurus (book), a 2012 Russian novel Eugene Vodolazkin
Laurus Škurla (1928–2008), First Hierarch of the Russian Orthodox Church Outside Russia
Saint Laurus, a second-century legendary Christian martyr

See also
Laurel (disambiguation)
Laur (surname)